This is a list of media associated with the Mickey Mouse universe, a fictional shared universe which is the setting for stories involving Disney cartoon characters Mickey and Minnie Mouse, Pluto, Goofy, and many other characters. The universe originated from the Mickey Mouse animated short films produced by Disney starting in 1928.

Television series

Feature films

Video games

Mickey Mouse games

Donald Duck games 
The following games are based around Donald Duck properties.

Goofy games 
The following games are based around the character Goofy.

Rhythm games

Sports games

The Disney Afternoon 
The following games are based around DuckTales, Darkwing Duck and other Disney Afternoon properties.

Other games 
Games that do not fit in the above lists or the franchises they belong weren't listed above.

Comics

Comic strips

Ongoing titles
The following is a list of all ongoing Mickey Mouse universe comic book series:

Books

References

 Media
Disney-related lists